Welcome To our Nightmare: A Tribute To Alice Cooper is a tribute album to Alice Cooper. Released in 1993 on Triple X Records, the album features covers of various Alice Cooper songs from a variety of rock artists.

Liner notes
The album features liner notes by Wayne Kramer, MC5 guitar player and founder. It reads:

Track listing

Personnel
 Bruce S. L. Duff — Project Coordinator (Tapes & Phones) 
 Peter Heur — Executive Producer
 Dean Naleway — Executive Producer
 Dan Hirsch — Mastering
 Lisa Sutton — Art direction
 David Griffith - Cover Photo
 Alex Leon, Jr. (Shark) - Inside Photos

References

Alice Cooper
1993 compilation albums
Heavy metal compilation albums
Glam rock compilation albums
Tribute albums